Ectoedemia monemvasiae is a moth of the family Nepticulidae. It is found in Greece (Peloponnesos) and Turkey (Anatolia).

The wingspan is 6.5-7.5 mm. Adults have been caught in July and early August.

Unlike most other Nepticulidae species, the larvae mine the bark of their host, rather than the leaves. The host plant is probably a Fagaceae species.

External links
Fauna Europaea
A Taxonomic Revision Of The Western Palaearctic Species Of The Subgenera Zimmermannia Hering And Ectoedemia Busck s.str. (Lepidoptera, Nepticulidae), With Notes On Their Phylogeny

Nepticulidae
Moths of Europe
Moths of Asia
Moths described in 1985